Erdem Onur Beytaş (born 30 April 1998) is a Turkish footballer who plays as a midfielder for Yeni Mersin İdmanyurdu.

Club career
Erdem Onur made his professional debut with Kayserispor in a 5-0 loss to İstanbul Başakşehir on 14 January 2017.

References

External links

1995 births
People from Kayseri
Living people
Turkish footballers
Association football midfielders
Kayserispor footballers
Darıca Gençlerbirliği footballers
İskenderun FK footballers
Ankara Keçiörengücü S.K. footballers
24 Erzincanspor footballers
Kütahyaspor footballers
Süper Lig players
TFF First League players
TFF Third League players